One millionth is equal to 0.000 001, or 1 x 10−6 in scientific notation. Units using this fraction can be indicated using the prefix "micro-" from Greek, meaning "small". Numbers of this quantity are expressed in terms of μ (the Greek letter mu).

"Millionth" can also mean the ordinal number that comes after the nine hundred, ninety-nine thousand, nine hundred, ninety-ninth and before the million and first.

See also 
 International System of Units
 Micro-
 International Map of the World
 Order of magnitude (numbers)
 Order of magnitude
 Parts-per notation
 Per mille

References

Fractions (mathematics)
Rational numbers